Senbagh, also spelt Senbag and Senbug, is an upazila of Noakhali District. It is named after its administrative centre, the municipality of Senbagh.

Geography
It is enclosed by Nangalkot Upazila (to the north), Noakhali Sadar and Companiganj Upazila (south), Daganbhuiyan Upazila (east), with Begumgaj and Laksam Upazila (to the west).

History
 
Senbagh was formerly under the jurisdiction of Begumganj Thana. However, it was not possible to maintain law and order in the northeast of this area as it was far away from the police station at Begumganj. Thus, a small outpost was established in the village of Senbagh, near the Baghra Dighi. The early 20th century marked an important part in the educational development of Senbagh. The Jainagar Wajidiyyah Alim Madrasa was established in 1900, and two years later, the Samir Munshir Hat Dakhil Madrasa was established. Another Dakhil madrasa, the Kadra Hamidiyyah Madrasa was founded in 1919. In 1922, Senbagh was officially established as a thana with Mirganj Bazar as its headquarters. Mirganj Bazar later came to be known as Senbagh Bazar. During the Bangladesh Liberation War of 1971, freedom fighters set up a training camp in Kanrihat while the Pakistan Army camp was situated at Domnakandi Primary School. A brawl emerged between the two factions in the latter camp where several freedom fighters were killed. Its status was upgraded to upazila (sub-district) in 1983, as part of the President of Bangladesh Hussain Muhammad Ershad's decentralisation programme.

Demographics
As of the 1991 Bangladesh census, Senbagh has a population of 216,309. Males are 48.24% of the population, and females 51.76%. This Upazila's eighteen-and-older population is 100,117. Senbagh has an average literacy rate of 43.5% (7+ years), and the national average of 32.4% literate.

The literacy rate among the town's people is 49.3%.

Administration
Senbagh Upazila is divided into Senbagh Municipality and nine union parishads: Arjuntala, Bejbagh, Chhatarpaia, Dumurua, Kabilpur, Kadra, Kesharpar, Mohammadpur, and Nabipur. Senbagh town consists of six mouzas. The union parishads are subdivided into 97 mauzas and 105 villages. Senbagh Municipality is subdivided into nine wards and fifteen mahallas.

Chairmen

 Women's Vice Chairman: Marium Sultana
 Vice Chairman: Golam kobir
 Upazila Nirbahi Officer (UNO): Nazmun Nahar

Facilities
Senbagh Upazila has 312 mosques and 14 temples. Many of the mosques are notable tourist attractions in Senbagh due to their antiquity or architectural style. These include the Haqqani Mosque in Qabilpur, the Senbagh Bazar Jame Masjid, Miah Bari Jame Masjid of Nolua, Kosha Ghazi's Mosque, Silonia Jame Mosque,  and Samir Munshir Hat Mosque. Other notable tourist sites include Qadra's Fort, Pir Anis Bhuiyan Shaheb's Jame Mosque, Bhuiyan's Dighi, the mazar (mausoleum) of Ghazi Yaqub Ali in Nalua and the dargah of the Five Pirs.

The upazila is home to other facilities such as the Parikot Orphanage headed by Qazi Mafizur Rahman.

Education

The average literacy is 70.3%: male 50.3% and female 20.0%. Educational institutions include: one government college, two non-government colleges, two government high schools, 23 non-government high schools, 19 madrasas, 79 government primary schools, and 41 non-government primary school. Cultural organisations include: 17 rural club, one cinema hall, and 14 playground. The main occupations are: agriculture 30.14%, agricultural labourer 16.66%, wage labourer 1.96%, commerce 10.99%, service 23.54%, transport 2.52% and others 14.19%. About 1,000 women and girls received sewing training from MAAWS Sewing Training Institute by June 2011. MAAWS also founded a computer training school at village Yarpur in Senbagh. There is a village in Domoria union named Gazir Hat where a high school (Gazir Hat High School), a primary school, (Domoria Primary School) etc., (the Akbor Ali Khan College). There is a village in Kadra union named Mogua where a high school, a primary school, and a vocational high school are situated. Freedom Fighter M A Azim Chowdhury is one of the founders and former headmaster of M A Ali High School and Vocational High School in Mogua Village.  Domoura and Mogua village are most popular in Senbagh upazila. There have a model many model village, one of them is Chandpur. Chandpur has many educational institutes. Chandpur Model High School is a famous educational institute. It was established in 1992.

The most popular village is Thanar par 9 no word under 1 no Chaterpaiya union. There is a standard educational institution called Fayzunnesa Ibtedaye Model Madrasah (established in 2019), which will comply with International Standard Educational procedures. Besides Islamic education, this Madrasah's students are taught spoken English and Arabic conversation, which are not available at other institutions in Senbagh upazila. It also has mandatory computer education and debate programmes. Mainly this Model Madrasah will be led by Chief Coordinator Mr. Abdul Ahad, Kamil Hadith, Jamea Ahamadia Kamil Madrasah, Chittagong, Manager HR AK Khan Group, Mr. Rakibul Hasan (Coordinator, student of Notre Dame College and Dhaka Divisional Debate champion, 2016) and Md.Sharif Uddin (Principal), Khotib Thanar par Central Jame Mosque. There are perfectly trained and well-skilled teachers and its target is to ensure quality education and to be one of the best educational institution at Noakhali under Chattogram Division.

Notable people
AH Muhammad Tawhidul Anwar Chowdhury, Gynaecologist and obstetrician
Muhammad Amirul Islam, Pioneer of agriculture and soil management in Bangladesh
Zainul Abdin Farroque, Politician

See also
Upazilas of Bangladesh
Districts of Bangladesh
Divisions of Bangladesh

References

Senbagh Upazila